This is a list of launches made by the Proton-M rocket between 2010 and 2019. All launches were conducted from the Baikonur Cosmodrome.

Launch statistics

Rocket configurations

Launch sites

Launch outcomes

Launch history

References

Universal Rocket (rocket family)
Proton2010
Proton launches